Scott Uderitz (born May 17, 1970 in Edmonds, Washington) is a retired American soccer midfielder who played one season in the National Professional Soccer League, one in the Continental Indoor Soccer League, and three in Major League Soccer.

Uderitz attended the University of Nevada, Las Vegas where he played on the men's soccer team from 1989 to 1992.  In 1993, he signed with the Cleveland Crunch of the National Professional Soccer League.  He played fourteen games with the Crunch.  He then spent the 1995 summer indoor season with the Las Vegas Dustdevils in the Continental Indoor Soccer League, scoring seven goals in 23 games.

In February 1996, the Kansas City Wiz selected Uderitz in the seventh round (66th overall) in the 1996 MLS Inaugural Player Draft. He played 28 games in 1996, but lost the entire 1997 season after tearing the medial collateral ligament in his right knee. He returned in 1998, starting 18 games out of 22 played.  He then only played two games in 1999 before retiring from playing professionally.

Following his retirement, Uderitz returned to Snohomish, Washington, and coached several youth soccer teams in the area. His son Hal played for the Seattle University Redhawks and was selected in the 2022 MLS SuperDraft by Seattle Sounders FC. His younger son Beckham plays for the Seattle Sounders FC Academy.

References

External links
 

1970 births
Living people
American soccer players
Cleveland Crunch players
Continental Indoor Soccer League players
Sporting Kansas City players
Las Vegas Dustdevils players
National Professional Soccer League (1984–2001) players
UNLV Rebels men's soccer players
People from Edmonds, Washington
Major League Soccer players
Soccer players from Washington (state)
MLS Pro-40 players
A-League (1995–2004) players
Association football midfielders